Alexandra Nessmar (born 23 June 1994) is a Swedish racing cyclist. She rode at the 2014 UCI Road World Championships.

Major Results

2011
1st  National Junior Road Race Championships
2nd National Junior Time Trial Championships
2012
1st  National Junior Road Race Championships
1st  National Junior Time Trial Championships
2014
Tour de Feminin-O cenu Českého Švýcarska
8th General Classification
5th Stage 5
2016
4th Swedish National Road Race Championships
2nd Mountains Classification Lotto Belgium Tour
2021
3rd Swedish National Road Race Championships

References

External links

Alexandra Nessmar on UCI.org

1994 births
Living people
Swedish female cyclists
Place of birth missing (living people)
21st-century Swedish women